, was a Japanese tokusatsu television series in the Lion-Maru franchise that aired in 1972-1973, produced by P Productions and set during Japan's Sengoku period (the Age of Warring States).

Plot 

During the late 16th century (September 1, 1567 to December 31, 1600), a trio of ninja orphans are wandering Japan and saving people from evil by battling a villain of the week in each episode, all of which are serving the devil known as Gousan.  The main character, Shishimaru, has been granted the ability to transform into a superpowered anthropomorphic white lion, usually wielding a katana.

Characters 

: A man who becomes  by unsheathing the katana  and uttering the words  to take on the power.
: An acrobatic female fighter who often becomes a damsel in distress.
: The young boy who uses his flute to summon the Pegasus known as Hikarimaru.
: The series' chief villain.
 (episodes 27-30, 36-54): A man recruited by Gosun, given the mysterious sword  to become .
: The elderly mentor who adopted the three war orphans (Shishimaru, Saori, and Kosuke) and taught them everything they know.  After perishing from an attack by Gousan's forces, his souls is reincarted as the Pegasus known as Hikarimaru.

Episodes

Cast 

Tetsuya Ushio as Shishimaru / Kaiketsu Lion Maru (voice)
Akiko Kujō as Saori 
Norihiko Umechi as Kosuke 
Kazuo Kamoshida as Kaiketsu Lion Maru (suit actor)
Shingo Fukushima as Tiger Joe (suit actor)
Kiyoshi Kobayashi as Akuma Gosun / Devil Gosuun (voice)
Kōji Tonohiro as Tora Jōnosuke / Tiger Joe (voice) [episodes 27-30, 36-41]
Yoshitaka Fukushima as Tora Jōnosuke / Tiger Joe (voice) [episodes 42-54]
Daisaku Shinohara as Narrator

Music
Opening Theme
 by  & 
Ending Themes
 by

International Broadcasts and Home Video 
The series was released in Japan on DVD on October 25, 2002 to commemorate the series' 30th anniversary broadcasting, via Volume 1. Then on December 25, 2002, Volume 2 of the series was broadcast. A DVD boxset that contains all 54 episodes of the series was released on March 26, 2008.
It was broadcast in Thailand around 1974 every Sunday on Channel 5 in Thai dubbed, as Nakak Sing (lit. Lion Mask).
The series was broadcast in Italy in 1983, dubbed, as Ultralion.
It was aired in Brazil with a Brazilian Portuguese dub under the title Lion Man (or otherwise known as Lion Man Branco as he became known in the region) on Rede Manchete in 1990, following the success of airing its' sequel series Fuun Lion-Maru, first. But unlike that, this series was reportedly a flop and it did not last long on the network, given that the sequel was more popular and that one actually aired first.
The series was also dubbed into English, but only one episode (the first) surfaced in North America, released on a VHS tape in the 1980s, entitled Magic of the Ninja and sold through toy store chains such as Toys R Us.

DVD release 

In P Productions' publicity materials for the 2002 DVD release, Lion Maru was subtitled The Beast-Transformed Ninja Warrior.

References

External links 
 
Lion Maru - Vintage Ninja

1972 Japanese television series debuts
1973 Japanese television series endings
Japanese television series with live action and animation
Ninja fiction
Tokusatsu television series